Hodson is an English surname.

Hodson may also refer to:

Places
 Hodson, California, U.S.
 Hodson, Nova Scotia, Canada
 Hodson, Wiltshire, England

Other uses
 Hodson Award, American Bar Association award for a public service organization
 Hodson baronets, baronetcy in the Peerage of Ireland
 4th Horse (Hodson's Horse), cavalry regiment of the Indian Army founded by William Stephen Raikes Hodson

See also
 
 Hudson (disambiguation)
 Hodgson

fr:Hodson